is a mountain located in the Nara Basin, in the city of Kashihara, in the central-western part Nara Prefecture, Japan. Together with Mount Unebi and Mount Amanokagu, it belongs to the so-called "Yamato Sanzan".

References

External links

Mountains of Nara Prefecture
Mountains under 1000 metres